Shlomo Gronich (born January 20, 1949) is an Israeli composer, singer, songwriter, arranger, and choir conductor.

Biography 
Shlomo Gronich grew up in a musical family in Hadera. He holds a B.A. in Music Education from Tel Aviv Educational Academy, and a B.A. in Composition from the Mannes School of Music, New York City. He is married to Michal Adler, a harmonica player. He wrote a song called Shir Israeli. His composition "HarmoniCadence" is being played frequently by harmonica clubs in Taiwan.

Compositions and arrangements 
Gronich is most widely known for composing and performing Israeli pop, folk and rock songs. His unique style blends different music genres, including Shirei Eretz Yisraels (the arch typical Israeli music style between 1940 and 1980), Israeli progressive rock with influences of rhythm and blues, jazz, ethnic, Mizrahi music, klezmer music and Middle-Eastern.

Albums 
He has more than 15 albums, including – 
 1971 Why Didn't You Tell Me?! (re-mastered version 2003)
 1973 Behind the Sounds (With Matti Caspi) (re-mastered version 2002)
 1979 Concert LIVE
 1981 Cotton Candy (re-mastered version 2004)
 1988 Moonlight Walker
 1991 Neto LIVE
 1993 Shlomo Gronich & The Sheba Choir – received Gold Album award
 2003 On the Way to the Light
 2008 Journey to the Source

Music for film 
He has composed music for film, writing more than 15 film scores, including:
 Thousand Small Kisses – First Prize Cognac film festival, Musical Score, Israeli Oscar for musical score (1981)
 Beyond the Sea – Israeli Oscar for musical score (1991)
 Circus Palestine – Israeli Oscar for musical score (1998)

Music for theatre 
He composed music for more than 20 theatre shows, including – 
 America – a musical, performed at the Kennedy Center, Washington DC (1976)
 America (revised version) – performed in Santa Fe Festival, New Mexico (1983)
 The Dream Pilot – a musical performed in Tokyo, Japan (1991)
 The Golem – a musical performed in Prague, Czech Republic (2002)

Music for ballet 
Gronich has also written music for ballet. His dance pieces include – 
 Song of Songs – Inbal Dance Theater, David's Violin Prize (1983)
 Looking for Jerusalem – Batsheva Dance Company, opening production, Israel Festival (1986)

Classical music 
Gronich composed more than a hundred classical compositions, many of which were performed by the world's most notable orchestras including the Berlin Philharmonic.

Notable performances 
 Appeared with Astor Piazzolla and the Israeli Philharmonic Orchestra (1986)
 Appeared with the Sheba and Moran Choir at the signing of the Jordan-Israel Peace Agreement (1994)
 Appeared with the Sheba and the Harlem Boys Choir at the Israel Festival (2000)

Notable prizes 
 2001 Hadassah Award, for his work with the Sheba Choir

Jewish-Palestinian collaboration 
Gronich composed and arranged a unique Israeli-Palestinian peace and coexistence song, called in Hebrew Hevenu Shalom Aleinu (We brought peace upon us) and in Arabic Ma'na Ajmal Min Salam (There is nothing more beautiful than peace). He gathered together a group of Jewish-Israeli and Palestinian singers and musicians to perform a beautiful, Middle-Eastern-style song, with a melody that combines Israeli rock, Arab pop, and Mizrahi musical elements (see #External links). The song was commissioned by the organization Peace Child Israel and adopted as its anthem. The lyrics alternate between Hebrew and Arabic, culminating in the refrain which is sung simultaneously both in Hebrew and Arabic. In the arrangement of the song, Gronich included the oud and the shofar. In July 2011, the song won Third Prize in the global Call for Music Videos of Palestinian-Jewish Duos or Groups presented by the Jewish-Palestinian Living Room Dialogue.

External links
Official website
video of Jewish-Arab Peace Song

20th-century Israeli male singers
Israeli composers
Living people
People from Hadera
1949 births
Mannes School of Music alumni
21st-century Israeli male singers